This list comprises all players who have participated in at least one league match for F.C. New York in the club's only season in the USL Professional Division in 2011. Players who were on the roster but never played a first team game are not listed; players who appeared for the team in other competitions (US Open Cup, etc.) but never actually made a USL appearance are noted at the bottom of the page where appropriate.

A "†" denotes players who only appeared in a single match.

A
  Ben Algar †
  Michele Aquino
  Jhonny Arteaga

B
  Gary Boughton
  Graciano Brito
  Brent Brockman

C
  Derby Carrillo
  Troy Cole
  Steve Covino
  Sam Craven

D
  Steven Diaz

H
  Kyle Hoffer
  Quame Holder
  Thorne Holder

M
  Chris Megaloudis
  Tim Melia
  Owen Morrison
  Tim Murray †

P
  Bony Pierre

R
  David Reed
  Erik Rengifo
  Stephen Roche

S
  Paul Shaw
  Don Smart
  Karsten Smith
  Josiah Snelgrove
  Sam Stockley
  Ilija Stolica †

T
  Joey Tavernese
  Tadeu Terra
  Christian Turizo
  Mauricio Turizo

W
  Bradley Welch

References

F.C. New York
 
Association football player non-biographical articles